Lathyrus latifolius, the perennial peavine, perennial pea, broad-leaved everlasting-pea, or just everlasting pea, is a robust, sprawling herbaceous perennial flowering plant in the pea family Fabaceae. It is native to Europe but is present on other continents, such as North America and Australia, where it is most often seen along roadsides.

Morphology 
Lathyrus latifolius has winged hairless stems, and alternating blue green compound leaves consisting of a single pair of leaflets and a winged petiole about 2 in long. The leaflets are narrowly ovate or oblong-ovate, smooth along the margins, hairless and up to 3 in long and 1 in across. There is a branched tendril between the leaflets.

Racemes 
Short racemes of 4–11 flowers are produced from the axils of the leaves. The flowers, which are unscented, are about –1 in across with a typical structure for Faboideae, with an upper standard and lower keel, enclosed by lateral petals. There are 5 petals, which are purplish pink, fading with age. There is a green calyx with 5 teeth, often unequal. The blooming period lasts about 2 months during the summer and early autumn.

Seeds 
The flowers are followed by hairless flattened seedpods, about 2 in long and  in wide, with several seeds inside. The seedpod, which is initially green, gradually turns brown, splitting open into curled segments, flinging out the seeds. The seeds are dark and oblong to reniform in shape.

Reproduction 
Lathyrus latifolius can reproduce vegetatively from its taproot and rhizomes, or by reseeding.

Cultivation and habits 
Lathyrus latifolius is a perennial herbaceous vine (climber), which can reach 6 feet or more by means of twining tendrils, but in open areas sprawls. It is frost-hardy, long-lived, and slowly spreading. The foliage becomes rather ragged and yellowish by the end of summer.

It requires partial to full sun, and loam or clay-loam soil that is moist, mesic, or slightly dry. Unlike the related annual sweet pea, Lathyrus odoratus, with which it may be confused, it has no scent. While grown as a garden plant it may be pervasive and difficult to remove. Because of this, this species is often considered to be a weed despite its attractive appearance.

Numerous cultivars have been selected as garden subjects, of which the following have gained the Royal Horticultural Society's Award of Garden Merit:

Relations to insect life 
Bumblebees pollinate the flowers. Butterflies visit the flowers for their nectar, but do not pollinate. Epicauta fabricii (Fabricius blister beetle), the caterpillars of Apantesis phyllira (Oithona tiger moth) and some herbivores feed on the leaves. However, the seeds are poisonous.

References

External links 

 Jepson Manual Treatment
 USDA Plants Profile
 
 Photo gallery

latifolius
Flora of Europe
Flora of Serbia
Perennial plants
Plants described in 1753
Taxa named by Carl Linnaeus